At the 2001 Goodwill Games, the athletics events were held at the ANZ Stadium in Brisbane, Australia from 4–7 September. A total of 44 events were contested, with 22 events each for male and female athletes.

Records

Medal summary

Men

Women

Medal table

Participation

 (52)
 (1)
 (6)
 (8)
 (1)
 (2)
 (2)
 (2)
 (1)
 (4)
 (1)
 (1)
 (13)
 (3)
 (1)
 (3)
 (8)
 (3)
 (2)
 (4)
 (1)
 (11)
 (1)
 (1)
 (1)
 (2)
 (21)
 (1)
 (21)
 (1)
 (1)
 (2)
 (1)
 (2)
 (1)
 (2)
 (2)
 (1)
 (11)
 (1)
 (1)
 (37)
 (3)
 (1)
 (2)
 (3)
 (6)
 (3)
 (1)
 (6)
 (71)

References
General
 Goodwill Games results. GBR Athletics. Retrieved on 2009-07-30.
 2001 Summer Goodwill Games - Athletics
Specific

2001 Goodwill Games
2001
Goodwill Games
International athletics competitions hosted by Australia
2001 Goodwill Games
Goodwill Games gold medalists in athletics